Sendari is a village in Niwari district in the Indian state of Madhya Pradesh.

References

Villages in Niwari district